Fletchers Glen is a small but mature temperate rainforest in Bouddi National Park in New South Wales, Australia. It provides habitat for two threatened plant species — the Magenta Lily Pilly (Syzygium paniculatum) and the Paperbark (Melaleuca biconvexa) as well as the only locally known population of Snowwood (Pararchidendron pruinosum).

Fletchers Glen contains three waterfalls with a creek flowing into Brisbane Water. The reserve has a wide diversity of flora and fauna.

Flora and fauna 

Flora species include:
 Eucalyptus botryoides | Bangalay
 Acmena smithii | Lilly pilly
 Ficus coronata | Sandpaper fig
 Doryphora sassafras | Sassafras
 Glochidion ferdinandi | Cheese tree 
 Pararchidendron pruinosum | Snow wood
 Archontophoenix cunninghamiana | Bangalow palm 
 Livistona australis | Cabbage tree palm 
 Synoum glandulosum | Scentless rosewood

Species of Fauna include:
 Australian brush-turkey
 Powerful owl
Satin & regent bowerbird
 Lyrebird
 Ringtail possum
 Brushtail possum
 Crayfish
 Eastern water dragon
Tree snakes

References

Central Coast (New South Wales)